Paisley North was a constituency of the Scottish Parliament (Holyrood). It elected one Member of the Scottish Parliament (MSP) by the first past the post method of election. Also, however, it was one of nine constituencies in the West of Scotland electoral region, which elected seven additional members, in addition to nine constituency MSPs, to produce a form of proportional representation for the region as a whole.

From the Scottish Parliament election, 2011, the town of Paisley was split between two new constituencies. Paisley largely replaced Paisley North and Paisley South. Renfrewshire North and West took some parts of the north west of Paisley.

Electoral region 

Before the 2011 Boundary Review, the other eight constituencies of the West of Scotland region were; Dumbarton, Clydebank and Milngavie, Cunninghame North, Eastwood, Greenock and Inverclyde, Paisley South, Strathkelvin and Bearsden and West Renfrewshire

The region covers the West Dunbartonshire council area, the East Renfrewshire council area, the Inverclyde council area, most of the Renfrewshire council area, most of the East Dunbartonshire council area, part of the Argyll and Bute council area and part of the North Ayrshire council area.

Constituency boundaries 

The Paisley North constituency was created at the same time as the Scottish Parliament, in 1999, with the name and boundaries of an  existing Westminster constituency. In 2005, however, the Westminster (House of Commons) constituency was abolished in favour of new constituencies.

Council areas 

The Holyrood constituency was within the Renfrewshire council area. The rest of the Renfrewshire area was covered by the Paisley South, West Renfrewshire and Glasgow Govan constituencies.

The West Renfrewshire constituency also covered a portion of the Inverclyde council area, and the Glasgow Govan constituency also covered a portion of the Glasgow City council area.

Glasgow Govan was in the Glasgow electoral region.

Member of the Scottish Parliament

Election results

Notes and references 

Politics of Paisley, Renfrewshire
Scottish Parliament constituencies and regions 1999–2011
1999 establishments in Scotland
Constituencies established in 1999
2011 disestablishments in Scotland
Constituencies disestablished in 2011
Renfrew
Politics of Renfrewshire